Melbourne University tram stop is a major terminating point and stop of the Melbourne tram system. It features a single island platform and three shunts. It is located on Swanston Street, Carlton, and is the major tram stop for the University of Melbourne, its namesake. It opened in 2005, and is one of the busiest stops on the network; six tram lines terminate at it, while two run through.

History
On 17 January 1996 a headshunt opened to the north of the Melbourne University tram stop on Swanston Street, Carlton, adjacent to the University of Melbourne to allow services from the south to terminate. It had one 100 metre central terminating line accessed by three crossovers.

Problems with the length of D class trams resulted in the headshunt being rebuilt as three separate 60 metre sidings in 2005. The project, begun by M>Tram, was inherited by Yarra Trams when it commenced operation of the entire tram system in April 2004, and was endorsed by the University of Melbourne and Melbourne City Council. It did however attract some controversy, with the Public Transport Users Association and Paul Mees claiming that the location was unsuitable, as if would force those wishing to cross Swanston Street to walk a further . Construction of the stop commenced on 11 January 2005, with the stop opening to passengers on 15 February 2005, for the first 12 days of construction tram services terminated either side of the works, with a shuttle bus diverting around the works site connecting the tram routes.

Design
Melbourne University tram stop consists of one island platform that provides accessible entry to low-floor trams, it is long enough to serve two D2-class trams at the same time, and has three shunts. It was designed by FMSA Architects for Yarra Trams and Department of Infrastructure. The design consists of six steel 'trees', clad with polycarbonate roofing protecting the seating areas; staff amenities; and ramps permitting full disabled access to the stop.

Services
Melbourne University tram stop is one of the busiest on the system, and is utilised by eight routes, six terminating and two through running.

References

External links

Buildings and structures in the City of Melbourne (LGA)
Tram stops in Melbourne
Transport in the City of Melbourne (LGA)
Transport infrastructure completed in 1996
1996 establishments in Australia